Koznitsa (Bulgarian Cyrillic: Козница) may refer to any of the following locations in Bulgaria:
 Koznitsa (village), a village in Burgas Province
 Koznitsa (ridge), a ridge connecting Stara planina and Sredna gora mountains
 Koznitsa (tunnel), a railway tunnel under the Koznitsa ridge, the longest tunnel in Bulgaria
 Koznitsa (peak), a mountain peak in the western part of Stara planina